Donal John Creed (7 September 1924 – 23 November 2017) was an Irish Fine Gael politician who served as a Minister of State from June 1981 to February 1982 and from December 1982 to February 1986. He served as a Teachta Dála (TD) from 1965 to 1989. He was a Member of the European Parliament (MEP) for the Oireachtas from 1973 to 1977.

Political career
He first stood for Dáil Éireann at a by-election in March 1965 for the Cork Mid constituency, following the death of the Labour Party TD Dan Desmond. The by-election was won by Desmond's widow Eileen, but at the 1965 general election in April that year Creed won the fourth seat in the four-seat constituency.

Creed was re-elected at seven further general elections, moving in 1981 to the new Cork North-West constituency when Cork Mid was abolished in boundary changes. From 1973 to 1977, he served as one of Ireland's first Members of the European Parliament (MEP), before MEPs were directly elected. Creed served on three of the European Parliament's committees: Agriculture, Public Health and the Environment, Regional Policy and Transport. He was also Chairman of Cork County Council from 1978 to 1979.

In Garret FitzGerald's first coalition government, Creed was appointed as Minister of State at the Department of Health from June to November 1981, and then as Minister of State at the Department of the Environment from November 1981 until the government was defeated in a budget vote in January 1982. Fianna Fáil was returned to power at the resulting February 1982 general election, but that government also was short-lived. When FitzGerald formed a second coalition government after another general election in November 1982, Creed was appointed Minister of State at the Department of Education on 16 December 1982. He held that post until he was dismissed from office as part of a reshuffle in February 1986.

He served as Chairman of the Fine Gael parliamentary party from 1987 to 1989. He stepped down from the Dáil at the 1989 general election, when his son Michael Creed held the seat for Fine Gael.

References

1924 births
2017 deaths
Fine Gael TDs
Members of the 18th Dáil
Members of the 19th Dáil
Members of the 20th Dáil
Members of the 21st Dáil
Members of the 22nd Dáil
Members of the 23rd Dáil
Members of the 24th Dáil
Members of the 25th Dáil
Local councillors in County Cork
Fine Gael MEPs
MEPs for the Republic of Ireland 1973–1977
Ministers of State of the 24th Dáil
Ministers of State of the 22nd Dáil
People from Macroom